Walter Sydney Woods (April 28, 1875 – October 30, 1951) was a professional baseball player. He played all or part of three seasons in Major League Baseball from 1898 to 1900. While he was primarily a pitcher, he also appeared at second base, shortstop, third base, and all three outfield positions. He also had an extensive career in minor league baseball, playing from 1895 to 1914.

External links

Major League Baseball pitchers
Chicago Orphans players
Louisville Colonels players
Pittsburgh Pirates players
Portland (minor league baseball) players
Haverhill (minor league baseball) players
Springfield Ponies players
Springfield Maroons players
Syracuse Stars (minor league baseball) players
Jersey City Skeeters players
Buffalo Bisons (minor league) players
Troy Trojans (minor league) players
Binghamton Bingoes players
Baseball players from New Hampshire
19th-century baseball players
1875 births
1951 deaths
People from Rye, New Hampshire
Sportspeople from Rockingham County, New Hampshire